Mathieu Spinosi (born 6 June 1990) is a French actor.

Life and career 
He is the son of the violinist and conductor Jean-Christophe Spinosi. Student on the Cours Florent, he is also a violinist and member of the Ensemble Matheus founded by his father. He is also admitted to the CNSAD and begins his first year from September 2011.

Filmography

Theatre
 2011: A Streetcar Named Desire

References

External links
 

1990 births
Living people
French male film actors
French male television actors
21st-century French male actors
French male stage actors
Actors from Brest, France